Joseph Sill Clark Sr. (November 30, 1861 – April 14, 1956) was an American tennis player. Clark won the 1885 U.S. National Championship in doubles with partner Dick Sears. He was also the inaugural singles and doubles national collegiate champion, in 1883. When he died in 1956, he was Philadelphia's oldest practicing attorney.

Biography
Clark was born in Germantown, Philadelphia, Pennsylvania, on November 30, 1861, to a family of bankers and financiers.  His father, Edward White Clark, was a partner in the family firm, E. W. Clark & Co. Clark's brother, Clarence Munroe Clark, would also become a tennis player of note.

As a student at Harvard University, Joseph Clark won the U.S. intercollegiate singles and doubles titles in its inaugural staging, in the spring of 1883. In the singles, he defeated fellow Crimson player Dick Sears.

Clark graduated Harvard in 1883 and later earned a law degree. He and his brother, Percy Hamilton Clark, opened a law practice  at 321 Chestnut Street in Philadelphia. The practice centered on the "street railway, electric light, and power businesses" operated by E. W. Clark & Co.

In 1885, he took the U.S. National lawn tennis doubles title, and also became champion of Canada, the first American to be so. Clark was also a semi-finalist at the U.S. National Championships lawn tennis singles in 1885, 1886, and 1887. In 1886 he won the Wentworth Invitation. He captured the unofficial 1887 and 1887 U.S. National mixed doubles championships with L. Stokes and Marian Wright (fr), respectively

He served as president of the United States National Lawn Tennis Association from 1889 until 1891.

On November 26, 1896, Clark married Kate Richardson Avery (1868-1951), whose family owned Avery Island in Louisiana. She was the daughter of Dudley Avery (1810-1879), who was the brother-in-law of Tabasco sauce inventor Edmund McIlhenny (1815-1890).

Their children included two sons: future Philadelphia mayor and U.S. Senator Joseph Sill Clark Jr. and Avery B. Clark. They had at least three grandchildren: Joseph Jr.'s children Joseph S. Clark III and Noel (née Clark) Miller, and Avery's daughter Kate Avery Clark.

In 1955, Clark was inaugurated into the International Tennis Hall of Fame.

Clark died April 14, 1956, in Chestnut Hill, Philadelphia, Pennsylvania.

References

External links
 
 Photo of "Kate's Hall" at 8440 St. Martins Lane in Chestnut Hill, designed in 1902-1903 by Clarence C. Zantzinger for Joseph Sill Clark Sr.

1861 births
1956 deaths
19th-century American people
19th-century male tennis players
American male tennis players
Harvard Crimson men's tennis players
Tennis players from Philadelphia
Clark banking family
International Tennis Hall of Fame inductees
United States National champions (tennis)
Grand Slam (tennis) champions in mixed doubles
Grand Slam (tennis) champions in men's doubles